Jean-Baptiste Chanfreau (born 17 January 1947) is a French international tennis player. He competed in the Australian Open in 1969 and in the Davis Cup a number of times, from 1970 to 1973.

Career finals

Doubles (2 runner-ups)

References

External links
 
 
 

1947 births
Living people
French male tennis players